Skull Worship is the sixth studio album by American psychedelic rock band the Warlocks, released in 2013 by record label Zap Banana.

Reception 

Skull Worship has been generally well received by critics. AllMusic wrote: "the album is a well-crafted exercise in dark psychedelia, recalling the effectively minimal melodies and percussion of the Velvet Underground, the buzzy doomstruck tone of the Jesus and Mary Chain, and the layered guitar tones of My Bloody Valentine, while adding a sinister beauty that's unique to this band." Chicago Tribune wrote that the album is "the sound of the Warlocks finally burning out on the most inward-looking album of the band's career." Less favourable was Q, writing: "Though still intermittently thrilling, even they must be beginning to feel like it's time for a change."

References

External links 

 

The Warlocks albums
2013 albums